Rob's Records was a British, Manchester-based independent record label founded by Rob Gretton, former manager of Joy Division and New Order, and a co-director of Factory Records.

Their first release in 1989 was the single "Security" by the US-based band the Beat Club, with a remix by Bernard Sumner of New Order. The label went on to release a series of dance records by local groups such as Sub Sub, Mr Scruff, A Certain Ratio and Digital Justice, as well international acts including the Beat Club and Roy Davis Jr.

In 1993, "Ain't No Love (Ain't No Use)" by Sub Sub hit No. 3 on the UK Singles Chart, providing the label with its biggest commercial success.

The label ceased operations shortly after Gretton's death from a heart attack on 15 May 1999.

See also
 List of record labels

References

External links
 Robs Records history at LTM
 List of releases on Robs Records at Discogs 

Defunct record labels of the United Kingdom
Alternative rock record labels
Electronic dance music record labels
Music in Manchester
Defunct companies based in Manchester